This article lists the confirmed national futsal squads for the 2012 FIFA Futsal World Cup tournament held in Thailand, between November 1 and November 18, 2012.

Group A

Head coach:  Victor Hermans

Head coach:  Diego Solis

Head coach:  Fernando Leite

Head coach:  Gennadiy Lisenchuk

Group B

Head coach:  Ali Sanei

Head coach:  Hicham Dguig

Head coach:  Agustin Campuzano

Head coach:  Venancio Lopez

Group C

Head coach:  Marcos Sorato

Head coach:  Miguel Rodrigo

Head coach:  Pablo Prieto

Head coach:  Jorge Braz

Group D

Head coach:  Fernando Larrañaga

Head coach:  Steven Knight

Head coach:  Roberto Menichelli

Head coach:  Ramon Raya

Group E

Head coach:  Tomáš Neumann

Head coach:  Badr Khalil

Head coach:  Luis Fonseca

Head coach:  Aca Kovačević

Group F

Head coach:  Arney Fonnegra

Head coach:  Carlos Estrada

Head coach:  Sergey Skorovich

Head coach:  Dickson Kadau

External links
 Official website

 
 

S
FIFA Futsal World Cup squads